Sawah Besar Station (formerly Sawah Besaar Station) is a railway station, located on Jl. Kyai Haji Samanhudi. Altitude this station is 15 meters amsl, this station is one of seven elevated stations on Jakarta railway's Jakarta Kota–Manggarai segment, and is named after the Jakarta subdistrict with the same name. Pasar Baru market is within walking distance from this station.

History

Sawah Besar Station is one of the oldest railway stations in Batavia, located on the Batavia–Weltevreden section of the Batavia–Buitenzorg railway line which was inaugurated by the Nederlandsch-Indische Spoorweg Maatschappij (NIS) on 15 September 1871. Initially, this station was a simple train stop. which was named Sawah Besaar and changed its name to Sawah Besar in the late 1890s.

The building of Sawah Besar Station is modern with touches of pink and white panels, which to this day are still preserved and have not been repainted. It is known, the project which was started in February 1988 spent  billion and when it was inaugurated it was not completely finished until finally it could be fully operational a year later.

Building and layout 
The Sawah Besar Station building is modern with a touch of lilac colored panels which are still maintained to this day and have never been painted, only the pillars of the platform have now been painted pale pink.  It is known that the project, which began in February 1988, spent Rp. 432.5 billion and was not fully completed when it was inaugurated, so that it was fully operational a year later.

This station has only two railway lines.

Services
The following is a list of train services at the Sawah Besar Station.

Passenger services 
 KAI Commuter

Supporting transportation

References

External links

central Jakarta
Railway stations in Jakarta
railway stations opened in 1873